The Royal Eise Eisinga Planetarium is an 18th-century orrery in Franeker, Friesland, Netherlands. It is currently a museum and open to the public. The orrery has been on the top 100 Dutch heritage sites list since 1990 and in December 2011 was placed on a provisionary list of future UNESCO World Heritage Site candidates. It is the oldest working orrery in the world.

History
The orrery was built from 1774 to 1781 by Eise Eisinga, a wool comber and amateur astronomer.

Eise Eisinga’s mechanical planetarium is built into the timber roof of the living room ceiling of his historic canal house. William I, Prince of Orange and the first King of the Netherlands was so impressed with the planetarium, he purchased the house and it became a royal planetarium.

The museum consists of the planetarium room, a screening room where documentaries are shown, and special exhibits based on modern astronomy.  Other parts on permanent display are Eisinga’s former wool combing establishments and a collection of historical astronomical instruments.  Those instruments in the collection include Georgian telescopes, 18th century octants and a tellurium, an educational model of the Sun, Earth and Moon.

The museum has a Planetarium Café and Brasserie De Stadstuin located in the former Van Balen coffee-roasting house.

In 2018, the Planetarium celebrated the 250th anniversary of Eisinga’s move to the city of Franeker in 1768, six years before he began work on his Planetarium.

It is listed as a Rijksmonument, number 15668.

The orrery was nominated 12 December 2011 by the Dutch government for UNESCO World Heritage status, based on its long history as a working planetarium open to the public and its continued efforts to preserve its heritage. In December 2018, it was announced that the Dutch minister of Education, Culture and Science will be sending an application to UNESCO to request a formal nomination of the orrery, bringing heritage status one step closer.

Orrery

An orrery is a planetarium, a working model of the Solar System.  The orrery is painted with royal blue glimmer and outlined in shiny gold paint. The Sun is painted at the center of the ceiling.  The Earth is represented by a golden orb dangling on a wire.  The zodiac is also depicted.  The clockwork-like mechanical planetarium moves as it does in reality at a reduced scale. The planetarium is very exact, but is not perfect. The pendulum, for instance, is made of a single type of metal so it is influenced by temperature fluctuations.

The "face" of the model looks down from the ceiling of what used to be his living room, with most of the mechanical works in the space above the ceiling. It is driven by a pendulum clock, which has 9 weights or ponds. The planets move around the model in real time, automatically. (A slight "re-setting" must be done by hand every four years to compensate for the February 29th of a leap year.) The planetarium includes a display for the current time and date. The plank that has the year numbers written on it has to be replaced every 22 years.

The Eise Eisinga Planetarium is the oldest still working planetarium in the world.

To create the gears for the model, 10,000 handmade nails were used.
In addition to the basic orrery, there are displays of the phase of the moon and other astronomical phenomena.

The orrery was constructed to a scale of 1:1,000,000,000,000 (1 millimetre: 1 million kilometres).

References

External links 

 
 Eisinga Planetarium at Atlas Obscura
 Eise Eisinga Planetarium at Jusonline.nl

1781 establishments in the Dutch Republic
Biographical museums in the Netherlands
Historical scientific instruments
Museums established in 1781
Museums in Friesland
Rijksmonuments in Friesland
Science museums in the Netherlands
Planetaria in the Netherlands
Franeker
Astronomy in the Dutch Republic
18th-century architecture in the Netherlands